Estradiol dibutyrate (EDBu), or estradiol dibutanoate, is an estrogen medication and an estrogen ester – specifically, a diester of estradiol – which is no longer used. It was a component of Triormon Depositum, a combination formulation of estradiol dibutyrate, testosterone caproate, and hydroxyprogesterone heptanoate which was developed in the 1950s.

See also
 List of estrogen esters § Estradiol esters
 Estradiol dibutyrate/hydroxyprogesterone heptanoate/testosterone caproate

References

Abandoned drugs
Butyrate esters
Estradiol esters
Synthetic estrogens